GEM (formerly known as Sony GEM) is a pay television channel owned by KC Global Media Asia. This channel was first launched in Vietnam on 1 January 2014 and was subsequently rolled out in other countries in Southeast Asia. The channel broadcasts its programming with subtitle in local languages.

On 21 February 2019, the channel was closed down in Vietnam due to low audience.

On 17 March 2020, both GEM and ONE were rebranded, with newer fonts for their logo and without the stylized "Sony" logo.

See also
 AXN 
 Animax 
 ONE TV

External links
 
 KC Global Media Official website

Nippon TV
Japanese-language television stations
Pay television
Television channels and stations established in 2014